Duder may refer to:

People
Tessa Duder, (born 1940), New Zealand author and former swimmer
Thomas C. Duder, (1850–1912), Canadian merchant and politician
Charles Duder, (1819–1879), Canadian merchant and politician

Fictional character

 "The Dude" or "The Duder", from the movie The Big Lebowski

Places
Duder, Iran, in Fars Province, Iran
Duders Beach or Umupuia Beach, in Auckland, New Zealand
Duder Regional Park, a park in Auckland, New Zealand